Demicron WireFusion an authoring tool for creating interactive Web3D presentations. A typical work flow consists of loading a 3D model, configuring/optimizing the 3D model and lastly adding widgets and logic to the presentation. The 3D model is created in a 3D modeling program, like 3DS Max, Maya or any other 3D modeling program that can export as X3D or VRML. The resulting presentations can run in browsers supporting Java 1.1+.

It is developed by Demicron AB, based in Solna, Sweden.

History

WireFusion 1.0 was released in 2000. This release was intended to be an alternative to Flash, for creating 2D animations and also interactive 3D graphics. The latter required a plug-in for WireFusion, WF-3D. With the release of WireFusion 2.0, no plug-in was needed to create 3D presentations. With the releases that followed, the focus was shifted more and more towards the creation of 3D presentations. Today, WireFusion is to be considered a pure 3D presentation authoring tool.

Demicron Reveals OS X Version of WireFusion 5

Key application features

Imports 3D models specified in X3D and VRML Format
Supports pure Java software rendering or OpenGL rendering using JOGL
Full scene anti-aliasing

Supported operating systems
Authoring tool runs on any platform supporting Java 1.6+
Player runs on any platform supporting Java 1.1+

External links 
 Demicron WireFusion home page
 Interview discussing WireFusion with Demicron CTO on 3d-test.com

3D graphics software